Z. insignis  may refer to:
 Zenia insignis, a plant species found in China and Vietnam
 Zenkerella insignis, the Cameroon scaly-tail or flightless scaly-tailed squirrel, a rodent species found in Cameroon, Central African Republic and Gabon